Félix María Arrieta y Llano (15 March 1811 – 29 December 1879) was a Spanish Bishop of Cadiz and Ceuta.

Biography
Félix María Arrieta was born in Cádiz in 1811 and became a priest in 1835 in the Order of Friars Minor Capuchin. He was ordained to be a Bishop in 1864 having been selected the year before.

He resigned in early 1879 and died later that year.

References

1811 births
1879 deaths
People from Cádiz
19th-century Roman Catholic bishops in Spain
Capuchin bishops